The 1966 Kilkenny Senior Hurling Championship was the 72nd staging of the Kilkenny Senior Hurling Championship since its establishment by the Kilkenny County Board. The championship began on 24 July 1966 and ended on 9 October 1966.

Mooncoin were the defending champions.

On 9 October 1966, Bennettsbridge won the championship after a 4–08 to 2–04 defeat of Mooncoin in the final. It was their 10th championship title overall and their first title in two championship seasons.

Mooncoin's Claus Dunne was the championship's top scorer with 3-27.

Team changes

To Championship

Promoted from the Kilkenny Junior Hurling Championship
 Knocktopher

Results

First round

Second round

Semi-finals

Final

Championship statistics

Top scorers

Overall

In a single game

References

Kilkenny Senior Hurling Championship
Kilkenny Senior Hurling Championship